Markazi Anjuman E Mahdavia, also known as Anjuman, is the most important community center for the Mahdavia community of Hyderabad, India.

In the early 20th century, Mahdavia community leaders held meetings at the home of Haji Muhammad Ali Khan. On 15 Muharram 1320 AH (24 April 1902), as a result of these assemblies, the center was founded.

Presidents

 Janab Syed Yaqoob Sahib s/o Sayed Nusrat (1913 to 1917)
 Peer-Wo-Murshid Syed Shahabuddin Sahab(Dec 1917 to June 1919)
 Khan Sahib Babu Khan sahib (1919 to 1926)
 Lisan–Al Ummat Qaaed–e-Millat Nawab Bahadur khan Sahib Bahadur Yar Jung (1926 to 1944)
 Janab Abul Hassan Syed Ali Sahib Advocate (1944 to 1950)
 Nawab Mandoor khan Sahib (Jan 1951 to Dec 1953)
 Nawab Aziz Ahmed khan sahib (Feb 1954 to May 1958)
 Dr. Mohammed Bahadur Khan SaljeMay (1955 to Mar 1958) (President ADHOC Committee)
 Janab Mohammed Saleem Khan Sahib Bozai (Apr 1958 to Oct 1962)
 Al Hajj Mohammed Khader Khan Sahib (1963 to 1968)
 Janab Moinuddin Shaik Imam Sahib (1968 to 1970)
 Al Hajj Mohammed khader Khan Sahib (1970 to 1972)
 Dr. Mohammed MahboobKhan Sahib (1972 to 1973)
 Janab Syed Ali Akber Sahib (1973 to 1974)
 Janab Mohammed Nasseruddin Sahib (1974 to 1976)
 Dr. Mohammed Mahboob Khan Sahib (1977 to 1980)
 Janab Syed Ali Akber Sahib (1981 to 1984)
 Dr. Mohammed Mahboob Ali Khan Sahib (1985 to 1992)
 Mirza Samiullah Baig Sahib (1993 to 1996)
 Janab Sardar Shah Mohammed Khan Sahib (Advocate) (1996 to 2000)
 Siraj e Millat Peer-wo-Murshid Syed Attan Shahab Mehdavi(2001 to 2003)
 Janab Sarwar Ali khan Sahib (2004 to 2006)
 Al Haj Janab Adil Mohammed Khan Bozai Mahdavee (2007- 2019)
 Peer-wo-Murshid Syed Mahmood Shahabuddin Kashif Miyan Sahab (2020–Present)

References

See also
Mahdavia

Mahdavi
Hyderabad State